George A. McDaniel (December 22, 1885 – August 20, 1944) was an American silent film actor and singer.

He was born on December 22, 1885, in Atlanta, Georgia, and died on August 20, 1944, in San Fernando, California. He appeared on total of 27 films.

Filmography

Graft (1915)
The Girl and the Game (1916) - Robert Segrue
The Final Conquest (1916) - Captain Hicks
The Hidden Children (1917) - Amochol
A Little Princess (1917) - Ram Dass
The Door Between (1917) - Archibald Crocker
Hell's Crater (1918)
The Shuttle (1918) - Sir Nigel Anstruthers
Hungry Eyes (1918) - Pinto Dupont
Beauty in Chains (1918) - Caballuco 
Unclaimed Goods (1918) - 'Gentleman Joe' Slade
Shark Monroe (1918) - Webster Hilton
The Man from Funeral Range (1918) - Mark Brenton
The She-Devil (1918) - The Tiger
The Shepherd of the Hills (1919) - Young Matt
Pretty Smooth (1919) - Mr. Hanson
The Woman Under Cover (1919) - Mac
Lombardi, Ltd. (1919) - Riccardo 'Ricky' Tosello
Lost Money (1919) - Ox Lanyon
What Would You Do? (1920) - Hugh Chilson
The Iron Heart (1920) - Darwin McAllister
Two Kinds of Love (1920) - Mason
 Silent Years (1921) - Henry Langley
Cameron of the Royal Mounted (1921)
 The Scrapper (1922) - McGuirk
 Burning Words (1923) - Mounted-Police Sergeant Chase
The Barefoot Boy (1923) - Rodman Grant

References

External links
 

1885 births
1944 deaths
Male actors from Atlanta
Musicians from Atlanta
20th-century American male actors
20th-century American male singers
20th-century American singers
American male film actors